Get-Rich-Quick Wallingford is a fictional con artist created by writer George Randolph Chester for a series of stories that first appeared in Cosmopolitan magazine. A book titled Get-Rich-Quick Wallingford: A Cheerful Account of the Rise and Fall of an American Business Buccaneer was published in 1907. J. Rufus Wallingford was also the hero of the following productions:

 Get-Rich-Quick Wallingford, a 1910 Broadway play written by George M. Cohan, with music by Cohan
 Get-Rich-Quick Wallingford (1916 film), directed by and starring Fred Niblo
 Get-Rich-Quick Wallingford (1921 film), directed by Frank Borzage
New Adventures of Get Rich Quick Wallingford (1931), starring William Haines as Wallingford and Jimmy Durante as his pickpocket friend

External links

Free book in various formats
Free ebook

Fictional con artists